Pogonocherus creticus is a species of beetle in the family Cerambycidae. It was described by Kratochvil in 1985. It is known from Crete.

References

Pogonocherini
Beetles described in 1985